Sucheta Kripalani (née Majumdar; 25 June 1908 – 1 December 1974) was an Indian freedom fighter and politician. She was India's first female Chief Minister, serving as the head of the Uttar Pradesh government from 1963 to 1967.

Early life
She was born in Ambala, Punjab (now in Haryana)  into a  Bengali Brahmo family. Her father Surendranath Majumdar, worked as a medical officer, a job that required many transfers. As a result, she attended a number of schools, her final degree is a Master’s in History from St. Stephen’s College, Delhi.

This was a time when the country’s atmosphere was charged with nationalist sentiments and the freedom struggle was gaining momentum.

She was a shy child, self-conscious about her appearance and intellect, as she points out in her book, An Unfinished Autobiography. It was the age she grew up in and the situations she faced that shaped her personality. Sucheta recounts how, as a 10-year-old, she and her siblings had heard their father and his friends talk about the Jallianwala Bagh massacre. It left them so outraged that they vented their anger on some of the Anglo-Indian children they played with, by calling them names.

Both Sucheta and her sister Sulekha were desperate to join India’s burgeoning Independence movement. There is one particularly fascinating incident which Sucheta narrates in her book. After the Jallianwala Bagh massacre, the Prince of Wales had visited Delhi. Girls from her school were taken to stand near the Kudsia Garden to honour the Prince of Wales. Despite wanting to refuse, both the sisters couldn't, and that left them bitterly outraged at their apparent cowardice.

“This did not absolve our conscience from feeling shame. We both felt very small of our cowardice,” she writes.

Later, while a student of Kinnaird College in Lahore, her Bible class teacher had said some disparaging things about Hinduism. Furious, Sucheta and her sister went home and asked their father to help them out. He coached them on some religious teachings and, the next day, the girls confronted their teacher with quotes from the Bhagavad Gita. The teacher never referred to Hinduism in class ever again! 

She studied at Indraprastha College and Punjab University before becoming a Professor of Constitutional History at Banaras Hindu University. In 1936, she married J. B. Kripalani, a prominent figure of the Indian National Congress, who was twenty years her senior. The marriage was opposed by both families, as well as by Gandhi himself, although he eventually relented.

Freedom movement and independence
Like her contemporaries Aruna Asaf Ali and Usha Mehta, she came to the forefront during the Quit India Movement and was arrested by British . She later worked closely with Mahatma Gandhi during the Partition riots. She accompanied him to Noakhali in 1946.

She was one of the few women who were elected to the Constituent Assembly of India. She was elected as the first woman CM of state of Uttar Pradesh from the Kanpur constituency and was part of the subcommittee that drafted the Indian Constitution. She became a part of the subcommittee that laid down the charter for the constitution of India. On 14 August 1947, she sang Vande Mataram in the Independence Session of the Constituent Assembly a few minutes before Nehru delivered his famous "Tryst with Destiny" speech. She was also the founder of the All India Mahilla Congress, established in 1940.

After independence

After independence, she remained involved with politics. For the first Lok Sabha elections in 1952, she contested from New Delhi on a KMPP ticket: she had joined the short-lived party founded by her husband the year before. She defeated the Congress candidate Manmohini Sahgal. Five years later, she was reelected from the same constituency, but this time as the Congress candidate. She was elected one last time to the Lok Sabha in 1967, from Gonda constituency in Uttar Pradesh.

Meanwhile, she had also become a member of the Uttar Pradesh Legislative Assembly. From 1960 to 1963, she served as Minister of Labour, Community Development and Industry in the UP government. In October 1963, she became the Chief Minister of Uttar Pradesh, the first woman to hold that position in any Indian state. The highlight of her tenure was the firm handling of a state employees strike. This first-ever strike by the state employees continued for 62 days. She relented only when the employees' leaders agreed to compromise. Kripalani kept her reputation as a firm administrator by refusing their demand for a pay hike.

When Congress split in 1969, she left the party with Morarji Desai faction to form NCO. She lost 1971 election as NCO candidate from Faizabad (Lok Sabha constituency). She retired from politics in 1971 and remained in seclusion till her death in 1974.

References

1908 births
1974 deaths
Indian independence activists
Quit India Movement
Brahmos
Bengali politicians
People from Ambala
People from Kanpur
Indian National Congress politicians from Uttar Pradesh
Indraprastha College for Women alumni
Delhi University alumni
Women chief ministers of Indian states
Indian rebels
Indian women in war
Chief Ministers of Uttar Pradesh
Members of the Constituent Assembly of India
India MPs 1952–1957
India MPs 1957–1962
India MPs 1967–1970
Uttar Pradesh MLAs 1962–1967
Gandhians
Women in Delhi politics
Lok Sabha members from Uttar Pradesh
Lok Sabha members from Delhi
Women in war 1900–1945
Women in Uttar Pradesh politics
Chief ministers from Indian National Congress
Indian people of World War II
Indian women of World War II
Women in Haryana politics
20th-century Indian women politicians
20th-century Indian politicians
Women Indian independence activists
Women members of the Lok Sabha
People from Gonda district
Women members of the Uttar Pradesh Legislative Assembly
Prisoners and detainees of British India
Indian National Congress (Organisation) politicians
Kisan Mazdoor Praja Party politicians